Teferra Wolde-Semait (11 September 1938 – 25 June 2013) was an Ethiopian politician who has served as Ministry of Finance and Economic Development, and chairman of the board of the National Bank of Ethiopia from 1977 to 1982.

Early years

Teferra Wolde-Semait was born in Sheno, a town located in the Kembibit district of Shewa, Ethiopia, on 11 September 1938. His mother was Jemanesh Bedane and his father was Wolde-Semait Maremi.  He was the youngest of five children, the others being Tegegn, Bekele, Tirunesh and Zenebech. Shortly after his birth, his father, who was an arbegna (a resistance fighter) during the Italian occupation, died and Jemanesh fled the area with her children. Teferra was brought to Addis Ababa at an early age, where he entered Priest School and subsequently Haile Selassie I Kokebe Tsebha School, completing 1st through 12th grade with acceleration. After teaching in Wollo for a year, he attended Haile Selassie l University in Addis Ababa and graduated in 1964 with distinction, earning a bachelor's degree in economics.  After graduating, he was hired at the Ministry of Community Development and Social Affairs. After working for some years, he travelled to The Hague, Netherlands, to pursue an advanced degree, and obtained a master's degree in Economic Development in 1967.

Career
Teferra returned to the Ethiopian Ministry of Community Development and Social Affairs, where he formed and managed the planning unit.  He spent the years from 1967 to 1971 preparing Ethiopia's long-term development plan as well as the annual budget for the Ministry.  He then transferred to the Ministry of Finance, and, from 1972 to 1974, worked in the Embassy of Ethiopia in Washington, D.C. as Counselor of Economics and Finance.  While in that role, he worked closely with the World Bank, International Monetary Fund (IMF), USAID, and other organizations to boost the aid being given to Ethiopia.

Afterwards, he returned to Addis Ababa to manage the Lending and Investment Management unit of the Ministry of Finance where from 1974 to 1975 he worked on foreign assistance as well as government investments in various public enterprises.  Teferra became Vice President from 1975 to 1976, and then from 1977 to 1982, Ethiopia's 9th Minister of Finance.  While in his position he implemented changes such as reorganizing the Ministry's various departments.  Those changes led the way to increased revenue as well as improved budget delivery services, and also resulted in  Ethiopia obtaining development aid and loans from international organizations such as the World Bank, African Development Bank, and other countries.  At a time when his Government was under international scrutiny, Teferra worked to maintain economic relations with Ethiopia's allies with the aim to preserve Ethiopia's economic interest without pursuing political acceptance.

Teferra was the chairman of the board of the National Bank of Ethiopia during his years as Minister of Finance, effectively making him the country's overall Monetary and Finance chief. In addition to the above-mentioned job responsibilities, Teferra served as a board member in the National Planning Commission, Economy and Law committees, Telecommunications, National Coffee, Cattle Breeding and Beef, and Ethiopian Airlines committees.  In 1982, Teferra resigned from his job and took his family to the United States. This was considered a prominent defection from the Derg at the time. He was employed by the International Monetary Fund (IMF) in Washington D.C. and worked under several assignments until retirement in 2003 as Planning and Budget Senior Professional.

Death

While undergoing treatment at Johns Hopkins Hospital in Baltimore, Maryland, Teferra died on 25 June 2013 at the age of 74.  He was the father of three children and the grandfather of three grandchildren.

Achievements

 Assigned at the Overseas Development Counsel in Washington, DC, USA, from 1982 to 1983 where he conducted research on development growth in sub-Saharan African countries
 Assignment with the International Monetary Fund as Research Advisor to the Swaziland Government's Central Bank from 1984 to 1987
 Advisor with the World Bank on African Public Enterprises and studies on work execution and improvement
 Assigned by the International Monetary Fund to other central banks' policy and operations sections where he consulted on how to strengthen the banks' capacity through research and study
 International Monetary Fund and United Nations Development Programme (UNDP) coordinating technical assistance being given to the Namibian government and served as a Senior Consultant to the Namibian government's Ministry of Finance

Footnotes

Additional sources

Works

 Economic Study on Gambia, Lesotho, Malawi, and Sudan (1981)
 Development Policies of Sub-Saharan African countries (1983)
 Adjustment Policies of African countries Based on Ethiopia's experience
 Africa’s Public Enterprise Sector and Evidence of Reforms (1989)
 About SADCC member countries
 About Namibia's Fiscal Policy (1995)

Finance ministers of Ethiopia
Government ministers of Ethiopia
Defectors to the United States
1938 births
2013 deaths
20th-century Ethiopian politicians